Por Siempre Joan Sebastian (English title: Forever Joan Sebastian) is a biographical miniseries about the late Mexican singer Joan Sebastian, who is portrayed by his two sons; José Manuel Figueroa (as an adult) and Julián Figueroa (as a younger man and teenager). The miniseries is produced by Carla Estrada and co stars Arcelia Ramírez, Juan Pablo Gil, Irán Castillo, Miguel Angel Biaggio, and Livia Brito.

Broadcast
The series broadcast on June 27, 2016 on Univision at 10pm, taking the former timeslot of Yago. The first episode received high ratings, surpassing El Señor de los Cielos. It concluded on July 25, 2016. The miniseries then premiered in Mexico on August 1, 2016 on Canal de las Estrellas, replacing El hotel de los secretos, and ended on August 21, 2016.

Plot
This 18 part miniseries tells the story of Mexican singer Joan Sebastian from his childhood in Juliantla, Guerrero in Mexico up until his death in July 2015.

Cast
José Manuel Figueroa as Joan Sebastian †  (1978-2015)
Julián Figueroa as Joan Sebastian (1968-mid-1970s) / Himself (episodes 17-18)
Arcelia Ramírez as Leticia Gonzalez (based on Teresa De Jesús Gonzalez) (1978-2010s)
Livia Brito as Maricruz Guardia (based on Maribel Guardia)
Ernesto D'Alessio as José Miguel Figueroa (based on José Manuel Figueroa)
Miguel Ángel Biaggio as Enrico Figueroa (based on Federico Figueroa)
Irán Castillo as Celina Esparza (based on Alina Espino)
Juan Pablo Gil as Rodrigo Figueroa Gonzalez (based on Trigo Figueroa †)
Alejandra Ambrosi as Maica Jimenez (based on Erica Alonso)
Lumi Cavazos as Celia Figueroa †
Diego de Erice as Adrian Figueroa Gonzalez (based on Juan Sebastian Figueroa Gonzalez † )
Jessica Decote as Ivette Moran (based on Arleth Terán)
Martin Altomaro as Dionisio Figueroa (based on Raul Figueroa)
Raquel Garza as Maica's (Erika's) mother
Carlos Camara Jr. as Nacho Tappan (based on Alfredo Tappan) director of the telenovela Tu y Yo
Ricardo Kleinbaum as Emir Rojas (based on Emilio Larrosa), producer of the telenovela Tu y Yo
Abril Rivera as Leticia Gonzalez (Teresa De Jesus Gonzalez) (1973-1977)
Alejandra Robles Gil as Andrea Figueroa (based on Zarelea Figueroa Ocampo)
Ximena Martinez as Marcela Figueroa Esparza (based on Marcelia Figueroa Espín)
Viviana Serna as Nora "La Palomita" (based on María de Jesús Malacara "La Chuy") 
Adalberto Parra as Mario Figueroa (based on Marcos Figueroa † )
Zaide Silvia Gutiérrez as Amanda Figueroa (based on Yolanda Figueroa Figueroa)
Palmeria Cruz as Mary Lupe (based on María Del Carmen Ocampo)
Azela Robinson as Marissa (based on Alicia Juarez)

Episodes

References

External links 
Por Siempre Joan Sebastian on Univision
Por Siempre Joan Sebastian on Televisa

Mexican television miniseries
Las Estrellas original programming
2016 Mexican television series debuts
2016 Mexican television series endings